Athaliah (  Gotholía) was the daughter of either king Omri, or of King Ahab and Queen Jezebel of Israel, the queen consort of Judah as the wife of King Jehoram, a descendant of King David, and later queen regnant c. 841–835 BCE.

Biblical narrative

Accounts of the life of Athaliah are to be found in 2 Kings 8:16–11:16 and 2 Chronicles 22:10–23:15 in the Hebrew Bible. The text states that she was the daughter of king Omri of Israel, however, she is usually considered to have been the daughter of King Ahab and his wife, Queen Jezebel. Some scholars are of the opinion that Athaliah was indeed the daughter of Omri, but that she grew up as an orphan in the court of Ahab.  Athaliah was married to Jehoram of Judah to seal a treaty between the kingdoms of Israel and Judah, and to secure his position Jehoram killed his six brothers. Jehoram became king of Judah in the fifth year of Joram of Israel's reign. Depending on her paternity, Joram of Israel was either Athaliah's brother or her nephew.

Jehoram of Judah reigned for eight years. His father Jehoshaphat and grandfather Asa were devout kings who worshiped Yahweh and walked in his ways. However, Jehoram chose not to follow their example but rejected Yahweh and married Athaliah, the daughter of Ahab in the line of Omri. Jehoram's rule of Judah was shaky. Edom revolted, and he was forced to acknowledge their independence. A raid by Philistines, Arabs and Ethiopians looted the king's house, and carried off all of his family except for their youngest son, Ahaziah.

After Jehoram's death, Ahaziah became king of Judah, and Athaliah was queen mother. Ahaziah reigned for one year from the age of 22 and was killed during a state visit to Israel along with Jehoram of Israel. Jehu assassinated them both in Yahweh's name and became king of Israel. He had Athaliah's entire extended family in Samaria put to death, ending the Omri dynasty in Israel.

Upon hearing the news of Ahaziah's death, Athaliah seized the throne of Judah and ordered the execution of all possible claimants to the throne, including the remnant of her Omri dynasty. However, Jehosheba, Ahaziah's sister, managed to rescue from the purge Jehoash, a grandson of Athaliah and Jehoram of Judah, who was only one year old. Jehoash was raised in secret by Jehosheba's husband, a priest named Jehoiada.

As "usurper queen", Athaliah used her power to establish the worship of Baal in Judah. Six years later, Athaliah was surprised when Jehoiada revealed that Jehoash lived and proclaimed him king of Judah. She rushed to stop the rebellion, but was captured and executed.

Dating of reigns
William F. Albright has dated her reign to 842–837 BCE, while Edwin R. Thiele in the third edition of his magnum opus dates her reign from 842/841 to 836/835 BCE. However, a starting date of 842/841 for Athaliah is one year before the date of 841/840 that Thiele gave for the death of her son, Ahaziah, a conflict which Thiele never resolved.

In literature
In 1691, French tragedian Jean Racine wrote a play about this biblical queen, entitled Athalie. The German composer Felix Mendelssohn, among others, wrote incidental music (his op. 74) to Racine's play, first performed in Berlin in 1845. One of the most frequently heard excerpts from the Mendelssohn music is titled "War March of the Priests" ("Kriegsmarsch der Priester").

In 1733, the musician and composer Handel composed an oratorio based on her life, called Athalia, calling her a "Baalite Queen of Judah Daughter of Jezebel". Baal was the fertility god of the Canaanites, whom the ancient Israelites often fell into worshipping in the Tanakh/Old Testament.

Family tree

References

External links
 Josephus, Jewish Antiquities 9.7.1-5.
 Virginia Brown's translation of Giovanni Boccaccio’s Famous Women, pp. 102–106; Harvard University Press 2001; 
 Athalia, by Handel; The New Oxford Annotated Bible, third edition (2001), page 582.

9th-century BC births
830s BC deaths
9th-century BC biblical rulers
9th-century BC Kings of Judah
9th-century BC murdered monarchs
9th-century BC women rulers
Ancient queens regnant
Biblical murder victims
Biblical murderers
Children of Ahab
Dethroned monarchs
Kings of ancient Judah
Omrides
Queens consort of Israel and Judah
Women in the Hebrew Bible